Homedahl is an abandoned townsite in sections 29 and 30 of Seely Township in Faribault County, Minnesota, United States.

History
The town was originally settled by the Osul Haaland family, Norwegian immigrants.  Rasmus O. Haaland was the first postmaster, and named the post office in honor of a "[remembered] location in Norway."  The village had a station  of the Chicago, Rock Island and Pacific Railroad, and the post office lasted from 1877 to 1904.

Notes

Former populated places in Minnesota
Former populated places in Faribault County, Minnesota